Mansilla is a Spanish surname.

Geographical distribution
As of 2014, 62.9% of all known bearers of the surname Mansilla were residents of Argentina (frequency 1:556), 17.4% of Chile (1:828), 5.2% of Spain (1:7,357), 4.2% of Peru (1:6,175), 2.9% of Bolivia (1:2,960) and 2.7% of Guatemala (1:4,884).

In Spain, the frequency of the surname was higher than national average (1:7,357) in the following autonomous communities:
 1. Extremadura (1:2,400)
 2. Castilla–La Mancha (1:2,580)
 3. Community of Madrid (1:4,385)
 4. Melilla (1:6,351)
 5. Castile and León (1:6,357)

In Argentina, the frequency of the surname was higher than national average (1:556) in the following provinces:
 1. Santiago del Estero Province (1:128)
 2. Santa Cruz Province (1:150)
 3. Chubut Province (1:191)
 4. Tierra del Fuego Province (1:253)
 5. Tucumán Province (1:380)
 6. Córdoba Province (1:421)
 7. Santa Fe Province (1:444)
 8. Río Negro Province (1:473)

In Chile, the frequency of the surname was higher than national average (1:828) in the following regions:
 1. Los Lagos Region (1:68)
 2. Aysén Region (1:77)
 3. Magallanes Region (1:83)
 4. Los Ríos Region (1:554)

People
 Braian Mansilla (born 1997), Argentine footballer
 Cristopher Mansilla (1990–2021), Chilean track and road cyclist
 Eduarda Mansilla (1834–1892), Argentine writer
 Enrique Mansilla (born 1958), Argentine racing driver
 Humberto Mansilla (born 1996), Chilean athlete
 Lucio Norberto Mansilla (1789–1871), Argentine general and politician
 Lucio Victorio Mansilla (1831-1913), Argentine general and writer, son of the above
 Luis Mansilla (born 1986), Chilean track and road cyclist
 Marcelo Mansilla (born 1981), Uruguayan footballer
 Matías Mansilla (born 1996), Argentine professional footballer
 Miguel Mansilla (1953–2013), Uruguayan professional footballer
 Niusha Mansilla (born 1971), Bolivian middle and long-distance runner
 Roberto Mansilla (born 1981), Spanish footballer
 Williams Mansilla (born 1964), Minister of Defense of Guatemala

See also
Mancilla (surname)

References

Spanish-language surnames
Surnames of Spanish origin